Münzenberg is a German language surname. Notable people with the name include:
 Gottfried Münzenberg (1940), German physicist
 Reinhold Münzenberg (1909–1986), German football player
 Willi Münzenberg (1889–1940), German Communist political activist and publisher

References 

German-language surnames